Thomas M. Bacon (July 1803 – March 6, 1874) was an American politician from Maryland. He served as a member of the Maryland House of Delegates, representing Harford County in 1858.

Early life
Thomas M. Bacon was born in July 1803.

Career
Bacon was appointed as the notary public of Havre de Grace in 1852 and 1854.

Bacon ran as a Know Nothing (known then as American Party). Bacon served as a member of the Maryland House of Delegates, representing Harford County in 1858.

Bacon also worked as principal of an academy and justice of the peace.

Personal life
Bacon married, but his wife predeceased him. Bacon lived in Havre de Grace and moved to Oxford, New York, around 1871.

Bacon died on March 6, 1874, in Oxford.

References

1803 births
1874 deaths
People from Havre de Grace, Maryland
People from Chenango County, New York
Maryland Know Nothings
Members of the Maryland House of Delegates
American notaries
American justices of the peace
19th-century American politicians
19th-century American educators